Julieth Restrepo (born December 19, 1986) is a Colombian model and actress.

Career 
Restrepo began her acting career with the 2006 Colombian horror film At the End of the Spectra. She has also acted in live theater. She was nominated for :es:Premios India Catalina in best actress category. She acted in the Colombian films La semilla del silencio and Malcriados. As her roles varied from religious to a prostitute, Colombian newspaper :es:La Opinión (Colombia) described her as a versatile actress. She had portrayed Laura of Saint Catherine of Siena on screen in the Colombian show Laura, una vida extraordinaria.

In 2022, it was announced that Restrepo would star as the late Colombian suffragist and Senator Esmeralda Arboleda Cadavid in a film titled Estimados Señores (Dear Gentlemen).

Personal life 

Her hometown is Medellín. She moved to Los Angeles to shoot her first English short movie "Do Not Lose".

References

External links 

Colombian actresses
Colombian female models
Place of birth missing (living people)
1986 births
Living people